Simon Schubert (born 1976) is an artist based in Cologne, Germany, his birthplace. From 1997 to 2004 he trained at the Kunstakademie Düsseldorf in the sculpture class of Irmin Kamp.

Inspired by Surrealism as well as by Samuel Beckett, Schubert's works imagine architectural settings, common situations and objects, whereas the materials he uses are either simple or sophisticated - white paper folded or mixed media arrangements. Some of his paper foldings entered the West Collection, Oaks, PA, while the Saatchi Collection, London, owns sculptural works in mixed media.

In 2008, Schubert received the ZVAB Phönix Art Award for newcomers.

Selected exhibitions

2018

Beyond the Doubt of a Shadow, Foley Gallery, New York City, NY

2008

monode, Kunst-Station St. Peter, Cologne

paper8, Upstairs Berlin 

2007

Mythos, Upstairs Berlin – Zimmerstrasse, Berlin

Paramären, Kudlek van der Grinten Galerie, Cologne
 
Entropia, Villa de Bank, Enschede, NL

2006

Klasse Kamp, 1974-2006, Kunsthalle Düsseldorf

2005 

Entwohner, Galerie van der Grinten, Cologne Kunstraum 22, Cologne 

Stipendienausstellung des Vordemberge-Gildewart Stipendium, KölnKunst 7 

2004

Bergischer Kunstpreis 2004, Museum Baden, Solingen

Airport Art, Frankfurt am Main 

2001 

Exhibition of the Kamp Class, Handwerkskammer Düsseldorf Alte Feuerwache, Cologne 

1999 

Villa de Bank, Enschede

References

External links
Images, texts and biography from the Saatchi Gallery
Further information from the gallery upstairs berlin
Further information from Kudluk van der Grinten
Simon Schubert on ArtFacts.net
Simon Schubert on ArtNet.com

1976 births
Living people
German artists
Kunstakademie Düsseldorf alumni